Henry Oliver "Doc" Cronkite (March 15, 1911 – December 27, 1949) was an American football player.

Biography
He played college football at the end position for the Kansas State Wildcats football team and was selected by the United Press, Newspaper Enterprise Association, and College Humor as a first-team player on the 1931 College Football All-America Team. He played professional football in 1934 for the Brooklyn Dodgers. He died due to complications following a leg amputation.

References 

1911 births
1949 deaths
American football guards
Kansas State Wildcats football players
Players of American football from Camden, New Jersey
American amputees